Mery Valencia de Ortiz (born August 28, 1953), also known as "La Señora", is a former Colombian drug trafficker who led a narcotics operation based on Miami and was one of the leaders of the Cali Cartel.

Biography

Valencia was born in the slums of Cali, Colombia. She had multiple contacts with drug traffickers and became associated with the Cali Cartel, later moving to Miami in the 1970s. In the 1980s, she began a mass distribution of cocaine and heroin across the United States. Many of her family members were involved in drug trafficking and Valencia owned hair salons and beauty parlors as a front for her drug trafficking organization. She maintained a vast network of cash houses and kept ledger books, recording all members of her organization. She later became a naturalized American citizen.

On February 7, 1997, FBI agents and Brazilian authorities arrested Valencia at the airport in Rio de Janeiro. She had undergone extensive plastic surgery to alter her appearance and carried 13 passports with false names. After the Brazilian Supreme Court rejected the appeal to block extradition, Valencia was extradited to the United States and imprisoned in New York to await trial at the Manhattan Federal Court. On July 30, 1999, Valencia was convicted on drug trafficking charges and sentenced to life imprisonment.

On 2012, Valencia was released from the Federal Correctional Institution in Tallahassee. Her current whereabouts are unknown, though is speculated that she returned to Colombia.

See also
Griselda Blanco, another female Colombian drug trafficker based out of Miami
Cali Cartel

References

1953 births
Living people
Colombian emigrants to the United States
20th-century criminals
Colombian female criminals
Female organized crime figures
Colombian drug traffickers
Cali Cartel traffickers
Prisoners and detainees of the United States federal government
People from Cali
People extradited to the United States
People extradited from Brazil
Colombian crime bosses
Naturalized citizens of the United States